USS SC-500 was a United States Navy SC-497-class submarine chaser in commission from 1942 to 1945 during World War II. She later served in the Soviet Navy as BO-319.

Construction and commissioning
SC-500 was laid down on 27 February 1942 by the Fisher Boat Works in Detroit, Michigan, and launched on 11 October 1942.  She was commissioned on 31 March 1942.

Service history

After World War II service in the U.S Navy, SC-500 was selected for transfer to the Soviet Navy in Project Hula – a secret program for the transfer of U.S. Navy ships to the Soviet Navy at Cold Bay, Territory of Alaska, in anticipation of the Soviet Union joining the war against Japan. Following the completion of training for her Soviet crew, SC-500 was decommissioned on 10 June 1945 at Cold Bay and transferred to the Soviet Union under Lend-Lease immediately. Also commissioned into the Soviet Navy immediately, she was designated as a bolshiye okhotniki za povodnimi lodkami ("large submarine hunter") and renamed BO-319 in Soviet service. She soon departed Cold Bay and, after a stop at Adak to refuel and reprovision, proceeded to Petropavlovsk-Kamchatsky in the Soviet Union, where she served as a patrol vessel in the Soviet Far East.

Disposal
In February 1946, the United States began negotiations for the return of ships loaned to the Soviet Union for use during World War II, and on 8 May 1947, United States Secretary of the Navy James V. Forrestal informed the United States Department of State that the United States Department of the Navy wanted 480 of the 585 combatant ships it had transferred to the Soviet Union for World War II use returned. Deteroriating relations between the two countries as the Cold War broke out led to protracted negotiations over the ships, and by the mid-1950s the U.S. Navy found it too expensive to bring home ships that had become worthless to it anyway. Many ex-American ships were merely administratively "returned" to the United States and instead sold for scrap in the Soviet Union, while others, at the suggestion of the Soviets, were destroyed off the Soviet coast under the observation of American naval authorities. In 1956, BO-319 was destroyed, probably off Nakhodka, under the latter arrangement.

See also 
 Other ships built by Fisher Boat Works:
 MV Cape Pine
 HNoMS Hitra
 USS SC-499

References

Motor Gunboat/Patrol Gunboat Photo Archive: SC-500

SC-497-class submarine chasers
Ships built in Detroit
1942 ships
World War II patrol vessels of the United States
SC-497-class submarine chasers of the Soviet Navy
Ships transferred from the United States Navy to the Soviet Navy
Cold War patrol vessels of the Soviet Union
Ships transferred under Project Hula